Kalvakota is a village in the Karimnagar District of Telangana State, India.

Villages in Karimnagar district